"En del av mitt hjärta" is a song written by Tomas Ledin, and recorded by himself on 1990 album, Tillfälligheternas spel. The song won a Grammis award in the "Song of the year 1990" category.

The single peaked at second position on the Swedish singles chart. The song also charted at Svensktoppen for 27 weeks between 21 October 1990—5 May 1991.

Charts

References

External links
 Information at Svensk mediedatabas
 Information at Svensk mediedatabas

1990 singles
1994 singles
Songs written by Tomas Ledin
Swedish-language songs
Tomas Ledin songs
1990 songs